"Lemon to a Knife Fight" is a song by English rock band the Wombats. It was released as the lead single from the band's fourth album, Beautiful People Will Ruin Your Life, on 7 November 2017. The music video for the song was released on 29 November 2017.

Conception 
In an interview with Australian radio station triple J, frontman Matthew Murphy said, "I was in Los Angeles, driving along Mulholland, and I was having an argument with my now-wife and she basically just handed me my own arse on a plate. I never win an argument with her, so that's kind of what the song is about."

Reception 
The song was generally well received by critics. The Edge UK described it as a song "soaked in emotion". Harry Fortuna writes, "The lyrics offer a melancholy that has become deeply associated with the Wombats, but successfully aligns it with the up-tempo, dance-inducing indie beat that is fit to take this once overlooked band to mainstream stardom." Rolling Stone described it as a song "full of electric buzzing guitars and firm percussion". Atwood Magazine described it as "violent and mysterious" while praising Murphy's clear vocals and the band's "signature jangly riffy guitar". The song was featured on BBC Radio 1's "Tune of the Week", as well as Radio 1's "Specialist Chart" in 2017.

Personnel
 Matthew Murphy
 Tord Øverland Knudsen
 Dan Haggis
 Mark Crew – production
 Catherine Marks – production

Charts

Certifications

References

2017 singles

14th Floor Records singles
The Wombats songs